Energy FM is the brand name of several radio stations:
 Energy FM (Canary Islands)
 Energy FM (Estonia)
 Energy FM (Isle of Man)
 Energy FM (Malta)
 Energy FM (Manila)
 Energy FM (Australia)
 Energy FM (UK)
 NRJ Russia, also known as Energy FM
 Energy FM (New Zealand radio station)

It may also refer to the Énergie radio network in Quebec.